The 2017–18 North Caledonian Football League was the 109th season of the North Caledonian Football League. The season began on 2 September 2017 and ended on 21 April 2018. Invergordon were the defending champions.

Bunillidh Thistle returned to the league following an eight-year absence, increasing the league membership to nine teams.

Orkney won their first league title, becoming the first Scottish Islands club to win a Scottish FA affiliated senior league.

Teams

League table

Results

References 

North Caledonian Football League seasons